The Soul Master is a novel by Graham Dunstan Martin published in 1984.

Plot summary
The Soul Master is a novel in which Kosmion builds an army of puppet extensions of himself by absorbing other men.

Reception
Dave Langford reviewed The Soul Master for White Dwarf #55, and stated that "I admired the ingenuity, but less so the writing: portentousness, reminders of the author's presence ('How shall I put it?' he wonders in print, breaking the narrative spell) and overuse of Significant Understatement."

Reviews
Review by Brian Stableford (1984) in Fantasy Review, August 1984

References

1984 British novels
Allen & Unwin books